Rubāb bint Imraʾ al-Qays, or Umm Rubāb was a wife of Husayn ibn Ali.
She was a daughter of Imra al-Qais, a chief of Banu Kalb, who came to Medina when Umar was Caliph. Ali proposed this marriage, but since Husayn and Qais's daughter were too young at the time, the actual marriage took place later.  Husayn had a daughter, Ruqayya, and a son, Abd Allah, (or according to recent Shia sources, Ali al-Asghar) from her. Husayn's , Abu Abd Allah, is probably refers to this son.

As a result of their deep affection, Husayn, composed poetry about her.
After Husayn's death she spent a year in grief at his grave and refused to remarry.

See also
 Imru' al-Qais ibn Hujr al-Kindi

References

 

Family of Muhammad
Battle of Karbala
7th-century Arabs
Wives of Shiite Imams
Wives of Husayn ibn Ali